David Gómez Benítez (1902 – death unknown) was a Cuban pitcher in the Negro leagues in the 1920s. 

A native of Havana, Cuba, Gómez made his Negro leagues debut in 1925 with the Cuban Stars (West). He played for the Stars through 1927, then finished his career with the Philadelphia Tigers in 1928.

References

External links
 and Seamheads

Cuban Stars (West) players
Philadelphia Tigers players

1902 births
Date of birth missing
Place of death missing
Year of death missing
Baseball pitchers
Cuban expatriate baseball players in the United States
Baseball players from Havana